We Are Puppets is the début studio album by the British band Tiger. It was released in 1996 and reached number one-hundred and eight on the UK Albums Chart. We Are Puppets includes the singles "Race", "My Puppet Pal" and "On the Rose", the latter of which was re-recorded for single release.

The album was produced by Daren Eskriett and the band-themselves, with the exception of "My Puppet Pal" which was produced by the band with Pete Briquette. Receiving mixed reviews the album was first released by the Island sub-label Trade 2 as a CD and LP in November 1996.

Track listing

Personnel
Tiger
Dan Laidler - Vocals, Guitar
Julie Sims - Guitar, Vocals
Tina Whitlow - Keyboards, Guitar
Dido Hallett - Keyboards
Seamus Feeney - Drums

Other personnel
Tiger - Producer
Daren Eskriett - Producer
Pete Briquette - Additional Production, Mixing, Producer ("My Puppet Pal), Mixing ("My Puppet Pal")
Dave Bernez - Mastering

B-sides
from "Race"
 "Honey Friends" - 3:19
 "Time Tunnel Cellar" - 2:10
 "I'm In Love With RAF Nurse" - 1:56

from "My Puppet Pal"
 "Icicle" - 3:53
 "Flea's Song" / Bonus Track - 5:57 (with Fleas)

from "On the Rose"
 "On The Rose (New Recording)" - 2:49
 "On Spanish Farmland" - 3:36
 "Babe" - 2:56
 "Ray Travez (Soho live)" - 2:20
 "Depot (Mark Radcliffe Show)" - 2:20
 "I'm In Love With RAF Nurse (Mark Radcliffe show)" - 1:52

References

Tiger (band) albums
1996 debut albums